Charles Paul Wilp (15 September 1932, in Witten – 2 January 2005, in Düsseldorf) was a German advertising-designer, artist, photographer and short-movie-editor.

Study and career
After school at the humanistic Ruhr-high school and after studying at the Jesuit-father François Xavier in Vannes, Wilp went to the Académie de la Grande Chaumière in Paris. He completed his wide-ranging education at the TH Aachen in synaesthesia, journalism, art and psychology. He was also student of Man Ray in New York.

Wilp developed a few of the most important advertisement campaigns of the 1960s and 1970s: Puschkin („Wodka für harte Männer“, 1963), Pirelli and Volkswagen (VW-Käfer-Slogan: „Und läuft ... und läuft ... und läuft“). He was also an image consultant for major politicians, like Willy Brandt.

Aerospace and art
In 1960, Yves Klein declared Wilp as Prince of Space. Wilp's interest in aerospace influenced also his most famous campaign in 1968 for the soft drink Afri-Cola, Slogan: „Super-sexy-mini-flower-pop-op-cola – alles ist in Afri-Cola“

Famous models of 1960s like Marianne Faithfull, Amanda Lear, Donna Summer, Marsha Hunt were photographed behind windows with ice-crystals.

Artist's friends
The art-book "Dazzledorf" (which presents in its subtitle the town of Düsseldorf as suburb of the world) with samples also of a few of his artists-friends like Ewald Mataré, Yves Klein, Andy Warhol, Mel Ramos, Otto Piene, Heinz Mack, Günther Uecker, Joseph Beuys gives a good impression of the art and style of this artist. Wilp also had contact with the artists Michael (Mike) Jansen, Helmut Tollmann and Joe Brockerhoff.

Collection
Some of his photos can be found today in Bildarchiv Preussischer Kulturbesitz, Berlin.

Literature
Wilp, Charles, Dazzledorf. Photography and texts by Charles Wilp. (texts German, English, Japanese, Arabian)o.J.
Wilp, Charles, Bundeskanzleramt. Inter Nationes, Bonn 1970,
Wilp, Charles, Wilp-Girl 70 : Charles Wilp present 12 Playgirls aus 5 Kontinenten

Works
 Konsumrealismus, Documenta 5 in Kassel, 1972
 Kunstblätter „Blick aus dem All“, 26. April bis 6. Mai 1993 in Oberpfaffenhofen (aerospace-mission D2)

Film-documentation
 Der gelbe Wellenmacher. German TV-documentation by Klaus Peter Dencker, ARD 1977
 monks - the transatlantic feedback. A documentary film about Wilp's collaboration with the first avant-garde pop band The Monks, USA/Germany/Spain 2006

Discography
 Prince Of Space, Musik Der Leere - (1965, Sight & Sound Production), with Yves Klein 
 Charles Wilp Fotografiert Bunny - (1965, Ata Tak)
 Michelangelo In Space - The Bunny Remixes - (2000, Ata Tak)

Dedicated museums and collections
His native town Witten (situated in the Ruhr region) has just established a Charles Wilp museum called "Charles Wilp Space".

External links
 Wilps Website ART AND SPACE / crosx mirror
 https://web.archive.org/web/20070928063205/http://www.fotogemeinschaft.de/v/fotografen/Klaus-Baum/documenta/charles+wilp+ulrike+lehmann_960_2.jpg.html
 https://web.archive.org/web/20070928063230/http://www.fotogemeinschaft.de/v/fotografen/Klaus-Baum/documenta/charles+wilp+juergen+klauke+1000ra.jpg.html
 Wilp-Feature, shortlist 2005
 Musik von Charles Wilp
 Charles Wilp at Discogs

External links to Afri-Cola-campaign
 Historisches Afri-Cola Plakat
 Idea of the "afri-cola"-campaign

1932 births
2005 deaths
20th-century German photographers
RWTH Aachen University alumni
Alumni of the Académie de la Grande Chaumière
Photographers from North Rhine-Westphalia
People from Witten